Croton insularis,  the silver croton, is a small tree in the spurge family. Growing in dry rainforest and rainforest margins in eastern Australia, north from the Blue Mountains. It is also found in New Caledonia and Vanuatu. Other common names include White Croton, Cascarilla, Native Cascarilla and Queensland Cascarilla.

References

insularis
Malpighiales of Australia
Flora of New South Wales
Flora of Queensland
Flora of New Caledonia
Flora of Vanuatu
Trees of Australia
Plants described in 1862
Taxa named by Henri Ernest Baillon